{{Infobox deity
| type = Trojan
| image = Pompeii - Casa del Menandro - Menelaos.jpg

| caption = Scene from the Trojan War: Cassandra clings to the Palladium, the wooden cult image of Athene, while Ajax the Lesser is about to drag her away in front of her father Priam (standing on the left).
| siblings = Tithonus, Lampus, Hicetaon, Clytius, Hesione, Cilla, Astyoche, Proclia, Aethilla, Medesicaste and Clytodora
| name = Priam, Last King of Troy
| offspring = (1) Hector, Paris, Cassandra, Helenus, Deiphobus, Troilus, Laodice, Polyxena, Creusa, Polydorus, Polites, Antiphus, Pammon, Hipponous and Iliona(2) Gorgythion(3) Lycaon(4) Aesacus(5) others
| consort = (1) Hecuba(2) Castianeira(3) Laothoe(4) Alexirrhoe or Arisbe(5) unknown”
| predecessor = Laomedon
| deity_of = King of Troy
| parents = Laomedon and Placia or Strymo (or Rhoeo) or Zeuxippe or Leucippe
}}

In Greek mythology, Priam was the legendary and last king of Troy during the Trojan War. He was the son of Laomedon. His many children included notable characters such as Hector, Paris, and Cassandra.

Etymology
Most scholars take the etymology of the name from the Luwian 𒉺𒊑𒀀𒈬𒀀 (Pa-ri-a-mu-a-, or “exceptionally courageous”),Haas, Die hethitische Literatur: Texte, Stilistik, Motive (2006), 5. attested as the name of a man from Zazlippa, in Kizzuwatna. A similar form is attested transcribed in Greek as Paramoas near Kaisareia in Cappadocia.
Some have identified Priam with the historical figure of Piyama-Radu, a warlord active in the vicinity of Wilusa. However, this identification is disputed, and is highly unlikely, given that he was known in Hittite records as being an ally of the Ahhiyawa against Wilusa.

A popular folk etymology derives the name from the Greek verb , meaning 'to buy'. This in turn gives rise to a story of Priam's sister Hesione ransoming his freedom, with a golden veil that Aphrodite herself once owned, from Heracles, thereby 'buying' him. This story is attested in the Bibliotheca and in other influential mythographical works dated to the first and second centuries AD. These sources are, however, dated much later than the first attestations of the name Priamos or Pariya-muwas, and thus are more problematic.

 Description 
Priam was described by the chronicler Malalas in his account of the Chronography as " tall for the age, big, good, ruddy-colored, light-eyed, long-nosed, eyebrows meeting, keen-eyed, gray, restrained". Meanwhile, in the account of Dares the Phrygian, he was illustrated as ". . .had a handsome face and a pleasant voice. He was large and swarthy".

 Marriage and children 
 See List of children of PriamPriam is said to have fathered fifty sons and many daughters, with his chief wife Hecuba, daughter of the Phrygian king Dymas and many other wives and concubines. These children include famous mythological figures such as Hector, Paris, Helenus, Cassandra, Deiphobus, Troilus, Laodice, Polyxena, Creusa, and Polydorus. Priam was killed when he was around 80 years old by Achilles' son Neoptolemus.

 Life 
In Book 3 of Homer's Iliad, Priam tells Helen of Troy that he once helped King Mygdon of Phrygia in a battle against the Amazons.

When Hector is killed by Achilles, the Greek warrior treats the body with disrespect and refuses to give it back. According to Homer in book XXIV of the Iliad, Zeus sends the god Hermes to escort King Priam, Hector's father and the ruler of Troy, into the Greek camp. Priam tearfully pleads with Achilles to take pity on a father bereft of his son and return Hector's body. He invokes the memory of Achilles' own father, Peleus. Priam begs Achilles to pity him, saying "I have endured what no one on earth has ever done before – I put my lips to the hands of the man who killed my son." Deeply moved, Achilles relents and returns Hector's corpse to the Trojans. Both sides agree to a temporary truce, and Achilles gives Priam leave to hold a proper funeral for Hector, complete with funeral games. He promises that no Greek will engage in combat for at least nine days, but on the twelfth day of peace, the Greeks would all stand once more and the mighty war would continue.

Priam is killed during the Sack of Troy by Achilles' son Neoptolemus (also known as Pyrrhus). His death is graphically related in Book II of Virgil's Aeneid. In Virgil's description, Neoptolemus first kills Priam's son Polites in front of his father as he seeks sanctuary on the altar of Zeus. Priam rebukes Neoptolemus, throwing a spear at him, harmlessly hitting his shield. Neoptolemus then drags Priam to the altar and there kills him too. Priam's death is alternatively depicted in some Greek vases. In this version, Neoptolemus clubs Priam to death with the corpse of the latter's baby grandson, Astyanax.

It has been suggested by Hittite sources, specifically the Manapa-Tarhunta letter, that there is historical basis for the archetype of King Priam. The letter describes one Piyama-Radu as a troublesome rebel who overthrew a Hittite client king and thereafter established his own rule over the city of Troy (mentioned as Wilusa in Hittite). There is also mention of an Alaksandu, suggested to be Alexander (King Priam's son from the Iliad), a later ruler of the city of Wilusa who established peace between Wilusa and Hatti (see the Alaksandu treaty).

 Gallery 

 Family tree 

Cultural depictionIn film Helen of Troy (film) played by Cedric Hardwicke.
 The Trojan Horse (film), played by Carlo Tamberlani.
 Troy (film) played by Peter O'Toole. 
 Troy: Fall of a City played by David Threlfall.In theater 

Les Troyens, in which King Priam plays a minor role. 

King Priam. 

See also

Priam's Treasure

 Notes 

 References 
 Apollodorus, The Library with an English Translation by Sir James George Frazer, F.B.A., F.R.S. in 2 Volumes, Cambridge, MA, Harvard University Press; London, William Heinemann Ltd. 1921. ISBN 0-674-99135-4. Online version at the Perseus Digital Library. Greek text available from the same website.
Homer, The Iliad with an English Translation by A.T. Murray, Ph.D. in two volumes. Cambridge, MA., Harvard University Press; London, William Heinemann, Ltd. 1924. . Online version at the Perseus Digital Library.
Homer, Homeri Opera in five volumes. Oxford, Oxford University Press. 1920. . Greek text available at the Perseus Digital Library.
Smith, William; Dictionary of Greek and Roman Biography and Mythology'', London (1873). "Priamus"

Mythological kings of Troy
Kings in Greek mythology
Trojans
Characters in the Aeneid
Characters in the Iliad
Mythology of Heracles